Malta has been involved with the Internet since the latter's early days.

The Internet country code top-level domain (ccTLD) for Malta is .mt and is sponsored by NIC Malta. The .eu domain is also used, as it is shared with other European Union member states.

Currently internet access is available to businesses and home users in various forms, including dial-up, cable, DSL, and wireless.

Dial-up

Dial-up Internet access was first introduced in Malta in the mid-1990s by various ISPs, including Keyworld, Video On-Line, Global Net, MaltaNet, and Waldonet.

This narrowband service has been almost entirely replaced by the new broadband technologies, and is generally only used as a backup.

Broadband

Commercial availability of broadband Internet in Malta, through ADSL and cable Internet, has existed since 2000, and is accessible from all areas of the island. Broadband connectivity has become very widespread on the island, with many households opting for a broadband connection.

ADSL bandwidth is received mainly through the Seabone Network, Interoute and Telecom Italia, operated by GO Plc and Epic, whilst there is another connection operated by Melita Plc

The bandwidth is then sold to the various ISPs which in turn sell it to customers.

December 2005, DataStream merged with the ISP Maltanet, giving Maltanet a competitive edge over other ISPs. Both DataStream and Maltanet were subsidiaries of Maltacom, the national telephone company, which is now integrated into one company called GO.

Cable Internet is offered by only one ISP, Melita Plc. Melita - Internet (formerly branded as OnVol) is a division of the cable and digital television provider, Melita Plc. Melita - Internet also offer standard ADSL connections for businesses.

In Q3 2007 Vodafone launched a fixed WiMAX based offering for Internet access. This increased the competition in Malta. However, since Q2/Q3 of 2011, this has been discontinued due to unsatisfactory results with the reliability of the WiMAX system, and is no longer offered to new customers. As of 2019, Vodafone began offering home broadband packages, although these use GO's fibre network as a base.

In 2010 Melita launched a service at 100Mbit/s, then the fastest in Malta. Melita also held the highest upload speed at the time with 4Mbit/s, which has today been matched mainly thanks to advances in telephone copper delivered internet through new technologies such as vDSL.

Since 2016, GO has been installing fibre-optic cabling across Malta; as of 2019, more than 100,000 homes (approximately 50% of Malta and Gozo) were included in the network, with full nationwide coverage expected by 2024.

References